Robert Collier may refer to:
Robert Collier, 1st Baron Monkswell (1817–1886), English judge
Robert Collier, 2nd Baron Monkswell (1845–1909), Liberal politician
Robert Collier, 3rd Baron Monkswell (1875–1964), British aristocrat and writer
Robert Collier (author) (1885–1950), author of self-help and metaphysical books
Robert J. Collier (1876–1918), publisher and aviation enthusiast

See also
 Rob James-Collier, British actor, currently in Coronation Street